Charles William Kennett Baillie (4 September 1902 – 5 October 1987) was a British swimmer. He competed in the men's 100 metre freestyle event at the 1924 Summer Olympics. Baillie was the son of an Edinburgh baths attendant. Baillie was also a club water polo player. He was also a police officer, working for the forces in Edinburgh and Oldham.

References

External links
 

1902 births
1987 deaths
British male swimmers
Olympic swimmers of Great Britain
Swimmers at the 1924 Summer Olympics
Sportspeople from Edinburgh
British male freestyle swimmers
20th-century British people